Holland is a geographical region and former province on the western coast of the Netherlands. From the 10th to the 16th century, Holland proper was a unified political region within the Holy Roman Empire as a county ruled by the counts of Holland. By the 17th century, the province of Holland had risen to become a maritime and economic power, dominating the other provinces of the newly independent Dutch Republic.

The area of the former County of Holland roughly coincides with the two current Dutch provinces of North Holland and South Holland into which it was divided, and which together include the Netherlands' three largest cities: the capital city (Amsterdam), the home of Europe's largest port (Rotterdam), and the seat of government (The Hague). Holland has a population of 6,583,534 as of November 2019, and a population density of 1203/km2.

The name Holland has frequently been used informally to refer to the whole of the country of the Netherlands. This casual usage is commonly accepted in other countries, and is even employed by many Dutch themselves. However, some in the Netherlands (particularly those from regions outside Holland or the west) find it undesirable or misrepresentative to use the term for the whole country. In January 2020, the Netherlands officially dropped its support of the word Holland for the whole country, which included a logo redesign that changed "Holland" to "NL".

Etymology and terminology 
The name Holland first appeared in sources for the region around Haarlem, and by 1064 was being used as the name of the entire county. By the early twelfth century, the inhabitants of Holland were called Hollandi in a Latin text. Holland is derived from the Old Dutch term holtlant ('wood-land'). This spelling variation remained in use until around the 14th century, at which time the name stabilised as Holland (alternative spellings at the time were Hollant and Hollandt). A popular but erroneous folk etymology holds that Holland is derived from hol land ('hollow land' in Dutch), purportedly inspired by the low-lying geography of the land.

"Holland" is informally used in English and other languages, including sometimes the Dutch language itself, to mean the whole of the modern country of the Netherlands. This example of pars pro toto or synecdoche is similar to the tendency to refer to the United Kingdom as "England", and developed due to Holland's becoming the dominant province and thus having the majority of political and economic interactions with other countries.

Between 1806 and 1810 "Holland" was the official name for the country as a whole, after Napoleon made his brother Louis Bonaparte the monarch of the Kingdom of Holland.

The people of Holland are referred to as "Hollanders" in both Dutch and English, though in English this is now unusual. Today this refers specifically to people from the current provinces of North Holland and South Holland. Strictly speaking, the term "Hollanders" does not refer to people from the other provinces in the Netherlands, but colloquially "Hollanders" is sometimes used in this wider sense.

In Dutch, the word Hollands is the adjectival form for Holland. Hollands is also colloquially used by some Dutch people in the sense of Nederlands (the Dutch language), occasionally with the intention of contrasting with other types of Dutch people or forms of the language—for example Limburgish, the Belgian varieties of the Dutch language ("Flemish"), or even any southern variety of Dutch within the Netherlands itself.

In English, Dutch refers to the Netherlands as a whole, but there is no commonly used adjective for "Holland". The word "Hollandish" is no longer in common use. "Hollandic" is the name linguists give to the dialect spoken in Holland, and is occasionally also used by historians and when referring to pre-Napoleonic Holland.

History 
Initially, Holland was a remote corner of the Holy Roman Empire. Gradually, its regional importance increased until it began to have a decisive, and ultimately dominant, influence on the History of the Netherlands.

County of Holland 

Until the start of the 12th century, the inhabitants of the area that became Holland were known as Frisians. The area was initially part of Frisia. At the end of the 9th century, West-Frisia became a separate county in the Holy Roman Empire. The first Count known about with certainty was Dirk I, who ruled from 896 to 931. He was succeeded by a long line of counts in the House of Holland (who were in fact known as counts of Frisia until 1101). When John I died childless in 1299, the county was inherited by Count John II of Hainaut. By the time of William V (House of Wittelsbach; 1354–1388) the count of Holland was also the count of Hainaut and Zealand.

After the St. Lucia's flood in 1287 the part of Frisia west of the later Zuiderzee, West Friesland, was conquered. As a result, most provincial institutions, including the States of Holland and West Frisia, would for more than five centuries refer to "Holland and West Frisia" as a unit. The Hook and Cod wars started around this time and ended when the countess of Holland, Jacoba or Jacqueline was forced to cede Holland to the Burgundian Philip III, known as Philip the Good, in 1432.

In 1432, Holland became part of the Burgundian Netherlands and since 1477 of the Habsburg Seventeen Provinces. In the 16th century the county became the most densely urbanised region in Europe, with the majority of the population living in cities. Within the Burgundian Netherlands, Holland was the dominant province in the north; the political influence of Holland largely determined the extent of Burgundian dominion in that area. The last count of Holland was Philip III, better known as Philip II, king of Spain. He was deposed in 1581 by the Act of Abjuration, although the kings of Spain continued to carry the titular appellation of Count of Holland until the Peace of Münster signed in 1648.

Dutch Republic 

In the Dutch Rebellion against the Habsburgs during the Eighty Years' War, the naval forces of the rebels, the Watergeuzen, established their first permanent base in 1572 in the town of Brill. In this way, Holland, now a sovereign state in a larger Dutch confederation, became the centre of the rebellion. It became the cultural, political and economic centre of the United Provinces, in the 17th century, the Dutch Golden Age, the wealthiest nation in the world. After the King of Spain was deposed as the count of Holland, the executive and legislative power rested with the States of Holland, which was led by a political figure who held the office of Grand Pensionary.

The largest cities in the Dutch Republic were in the province of Holland, such as Amsterdam, Rotterdam, Leiden, Alkmaar, The Hague, Delft, Dordrecht and Haarlem. From the great ports of Holland, Hollandic merchants sailed to and from destinations all over Europe, and merchants from all over Europe gathered to trade in the warehouses of Amsterdam and other trading cities of Holland.

Many Europeans thought of the United Provinces first as Holland rather than as the Republic of the Seven United Provinces of the Netherlands. A strong impression of Holland was planted in the minds of other Europeans, which then was projected back onto the Republic as a whole. Within the provinces themselves, a gradual slow process of cultural expansion took place, leading to a "Hollandification" of the other provinces and a more uniform culture for the whole of the Republic. The dialect of urban Holland became the standard language.

Under French rule 

The formation of the Batavian Republic, inspired by the French revolution, led to a more centralised government. Holland became a province of a unitary state. Its independence was further reduced by an administrative reform in 1798, in which its territory was divided into several departments called Amstel, Delf, Texel, and part of Schelde en Maas.

From 1806 to 1810, Napoleon styled his vassal state, governed by his brother Louis Napoleon and shortly by the son of Louis, Napoleon Louis Bonaparte, as the "Kingdom of Holland". This kingdom encompassed much of what would become the modern Netherlands. The name reflects how natural at the time it had become to equate Holland with the non-Belgian Netherlands as a whole.

During the period when the Low Countries were annexed by the French Empire and actually incorporated into France (from 1810 to 1813), Holland was divided into départements Zuyderzée, and Bouches-de-la-Meuse. From 1811 to 1813, Charles-François Lebrun, duc de Plaisance served as governor-general. He was assisted by Antoine de Celles, Goswin de Stassart and François Jean-Baptiste d'Alphonse. In 1813, Dutch dignitaries proclaimed the Sovereign Principality of the United Netherlands.

Kingdom of the Netherlands 
In 1815, Holland was restored as a province of the United Kingdom of the Netherlands. Holland was divided into the present provinces North Holland and South Holland in 1840, after the Belgian Revolution of 1830. This reflected a historical division of Holland along the IJ into a Southern Quarter (Zuiderkwartier) and a Northern Quarter (Noorderkwartier), but the present division is different from the old division. From 1850, a strong process of nation formation took place, the Netherlands being culturally unified and economically integrated by a modernisation process, with the cities of Holland as its centre.

Geography 

Holland is located in the west of the Netherlands. A maritime region, Holland lies on the North Sea at the mouths of the Rhine and the Meuse (Maas). It contains numerous rivers and lakes, and has an extensive inland canal and waterway system. To the south is Zealand. The region is bordered on the east by the IJsselmeer and four Dutch provinces.

Holland is protected from the sea by a long line of coastal dunes. Most of the land area behind the dunes consists of polder landscape lying well below sea level. Continuous drainage is necessary to keep Holland from flooding. In earlier centuries, windmills were used for this task. The landscape was (and in places still is) dotted with windmills, which have become a symbol of Holland.

The combined population was 6.5 million in 2018.

The main cities in Holland are Amsterdam, Rotterdam and The Hague. Amsterdam is formally the capital of the Netherlands and its largest city. The Port of Rotterdam is Europe's largest and most important harbour and port. The Hague is the seat of government of the Netherlands. These cities, combined with Utrecht and other smaller municipalities, effectively form a single metroplex—a conurbation called Randstad.

The Randstad area is one of the most densely populated regions of Europe, but still relatively free of urban sprawl. There are strict zoning laws. Population pressures are enormous, property values are high, and new housing is constantly under development on the edges of the built-up areas. Surprisingly, much of the province still has a rural character. The remaining agricultural land and natural areas are highly valued and protected. Most of the arable land is used for intensive agriculture, including horticulture and greenhouse agri-businesses.

Reclamation of the land 

The land that is now Holland has not been geographically "stable" since prehistoric times. The Frisian Isles, originally joined to the mainland, became detached islands in the north. The main rivers, the Rhine and the Meuse (Maas), flooded regularly and changed course repeatedly and dramatically.

The people of Holland found themselves living in an unstable, watery environment. Behind the dunes on the coast of the Netherlands a high peat plateau had grown, forming a natural protection against the sea. Much of the area was marsh and bog. By the tenth century the inhabitants set about cultivating this land by draining it.

To the south of Holland, in Zeeland, and to the north, in Frisia, this development led to catastrophic storm floods literally washing away entire regions, as the peat layer disintegrated or became detached and was carried away by the flood water. From the Frisian side the sea even flooded the area to the east, gradually hollowing Holland out from behind and forming the Zuiderzee (the present IJsselmeer). This inland sea threatened to link up with the "drowned lands" of Zealand in the south, reducing Holland to a series of narrow dune barrier islands in front of a lagoon. Only drastic administrative intervention saved the county from utter destruction. The counts and large monasteries took the lead in these efforts, building the first heavy emergency dikes to bolster critical points. Later special autonomous administrative bodies were formed, the waterschappen ("water control boards"), which had the legal power to enforce their regulations and decisions on water management. They eventually constructed an extensive dike system that covered the coastline and the polders, thus protecting the land from further incursions by the sea.

However, the Hollanders did not stop there. Starting around the 16th century, they took the offensive and began land reclamation projects, converting lakes, marshy areas and adjoining mudflats into polders. This continued well into the 20th century. As a result, historical maps of medieval and early modern Holland bear little resemblance to present maps.

This ongoing struggle to master the water played an important role in the development of Holland as a maritime and economic power, and has traditionally been seen as developing the presumed collective character of its inhabitants: stubborn, egalitarian and frugal.

Economy
The gross domestic product (GDP) of the region was €330.746 billion (US$B) in 2019.

Culture 
The stereotypical image of Holland is a contrived amalgam of tulips, windmills, clogs, Edam cheese and the traditional dress (klederdracht) of the village of Volendam, far from the reality of everyday Holland. These stereotypes were deliberately created in the late 19th century by official "Holland Promotion" to attract tourists.

The predominance of Holland in the Netherlands has resulted in regionalism on the part of the other provinces, a reaction to the perceived threat that Holland poses to their local culture and identity. The other provinces have a strong, and often negative, image of Holland and the Hollanders, to whom certain qualities are ascribed within a mental geography, a conceptual mapping of spaces and their inhabitants. On the other hand, some Hollanders take Holland's cultural dominance for granted and treat the concepts of "Holland" and "the Netherlands" as coinciding. Consequently, they see themselves not primarily as Hollanders, but simply as Dutch (Nederlanders). This phenomenon has been called "hollandocentrism".

Languages 
The predominant language spoken in Holland is Dutch. Hollanders sometimes call the Dutch language "Hollands," instead of the standard term Nederlands. Inhabitants of Belgium and other provinces of the Netherlands use "Hollands" to mean a Hollandic dialect or strong accent.

Standard Dutch was historically largely based on the dialect of the County of Holland, incorporating many traits derived from the dialects of the previously more powerful Duchy of Brabant and County of Flanders. Strong dialectal variation still exists throughout the Low Countries. Today, Holland proper is the region where the original dialects are least spoken, in many areas having been completely replaced by standard Dutch, and the Randstad has the largest influence on the developments of the standard language—with the exception of the Dutch spoken in Belgium.

Despite this correspondence between standard Dutch and the Dutch spoken in the Randstad, there are local variations within Holland itself that differ from standard Dutch. The main cities each have their own modern urban dialect, that can be considered a sociolect. Some people, especially in the area north of Amsterdam, still speak the original dialect of the county, Hollandic. This dialect is present in the north: Volendam and Marken and the area around there, West Friesland and the Zaanstreek; and in a southeastern fringe bordering the provinces of North Brabant and Utrecht. In the south on the island of Goeree-Overflakkee, Zeelandic is spoken.

Legacy

New Holland 

The province of Holland gave its name to a number of colonial settlements and discovered regions that were called Nieuw Holland or New Holland. The largest was the island continent presently known as Australia: New Holland was first applied to Australia in 1644 by the Dutch seafarer Dirk Hartog as a Latin Nova Hollandia, and remained in international use for 190 years. After its discovery by the Dutch explorer Abel Tasman, New Zealand was likewise named after the Dutch province of Zealand. In the Netherlands Nieuw Holland would remain the usual name of the continent until the end of the 19th century; it is now no longer in use there, the Dutch name today being Australië.

As contemporary exonym for the Netherlands 

While "Holland" has been replaced in English as the official name for the country of the Netherlands, many other languages use it or a variant of it to officially refer to the Netherlands. This is the case in Southeast Asia particularly Indonesia, Malaysia, and Cambodia for example:
 Acehnese: Blanda
 Banjar: Walanda
 Banyumasan: Landa
 Javanese: Walanda
 Malay (including Indonesian and Malaysian standards): Belanda
 Minangkabau: Balando
 Khmer: ហុល្លង់

References 

 
Regions of the Netherlands